Lillois-Witterzée is a village of Wallonia and a district of the municipality of Braine-l'Alleud, located in the province of Walloon Brabant, Belgium.

It was a municipality in its own right before the fusion of the Belgian municipalities in 1977.

References 

Former municipalities of Walloon Brabant
Braine-l'Alleud